Intergalactic Kitchen is a CBBC television series, based on the 1990 novel The Intergalactic Kitchen by Frank Rodgers.  It ran from January to April 2004.

The show had a distinct reality to it, with the normal themes (romance, adventures).

Practical special effects on the show were provided by well-known YouTuber Big Clive.

Plot
The show is about the Bird children (Robin, Snoo and Jay), their mother and Fleur, a rival from Snoo and Jay's school. They are about to go camping, when Mrs. Bird accidentally activates a force field and they are shot off into outer space. They attempt to get back to Earth, when a family of four aliens arrives in the kitchen. Then everything goes wrong, when Mrs. Bird accidentally climbs into the aliens' spaceship, and Mr. and Mrs. Krryptyx accidentally activate the engines, thus separating Mrs. Bird's children and Mr. and Mrs. Krryptyx's children. This leads both the children and the adults on a series of mad adventures.

Cast

Crew

Episodes

References

External links

2004 British television series debuts
2004 British television series endings
BBC children's television shows
British television shows based on children's books